Pumpkin's Delight is a live album by the group Sphere featuring saxophonist Charlie Rouse, pianist Kenny Barron, bassist Buster Williams, and drummer Ben Riley, recorded at the Teatro Morlacchi in Perugia, Italy, as part of the 1986 Umbria Jazz Festival and released on the Italian Red label. The 1993 CD edition features four tracks first released on LP in 1987 as Live at Umbria Jazz.

Reception 

In his review on AllMusic, Ron Wynn noted: "This 1986 concert by the quartet Sphere is one of the short-lived group's high points ... Recommended."

Track listing 
 "Pumpkin's Delight" (Charlie Rouse) – 12:05
 "Toku Do" (Buster Williams) – 11:00
 "Saud's Song" (Kenny Barron) – 10:40
 "Christina" (Williams) – 9:10
 "Deceptakon" (Williams) – 11:40

Personnel 
Charlie Rouse – tenor saxophone
Kenny Barron – piano
Buster Williams – bass
Ben Riley – drums

References 

Sphere (American band) live albums
1993 live albums
Red Records live albums